The  is a luxury crossover SUV sold since 1998 by Lexus, a luxury division of Toyota. Originally released in its home market of Japan in late 1997 as the Toyota Harrier, export sales began in March 1998 as the Lexus RX. Considered as the first luxury crossover SUV, four generations of the RX have been produced to date, the first being compact in size, and the latter three classified as mid-size. Both front- and four-wheel drive configurations have been used on the RX series, and several gasoline powertrain options, including V6 engines and hybrid systems, have been offered. In the Lexus model lineup, the RX sits below the larger GX and LX (marketed as the Toyota Land Cruiser Prado and the Toyota Land Cruiser body-on-frame SUVs outside North America), and above the smaller NX crossover with a lesser displacement inline-four engine. The name "RX" stands for "Radiant Crossover". It has also been labelled as "Recreational Cross Country" in some markets. The RX's current Toyota counterparts are the Highlander/Kluger; past counterparts were the Harrier and Venza.

The first-generation RX 300, fitted with a 3.0-liter V6 engine, began sales in 1998. The Japanese market Harrier released in 1997 also offered a 2.2-liter inline-four, later uprated to 2.4 liters. The second-generation RX 300 (3.0-liter V6) and RX 330 (3.3-liter V6) models went on sale in 2003, with both variants supplanted by the more powerful RX 350 (3.5-liter V6) in 2006. Like the previous series, a 2.4-liter inline-four engine was sold alongside the 3.0-liter V6 in the Japanese market Harrier. In 2005, a hybridized gasoline-electric version of the 3.3-liter second-generation model was made available as the RX 400h in export markets and as the Harrier Hybrid in Japan. For the third generation released in 2009, both RX 350 (3.5-liter V6) and RX 450h (3.5-liter V6 hybrid) models were initially offered, with an entry-level RX 270 (2.7-liter inline-four) offered by Lexus in some Asian markets, including in Japan, since 2010. Since the release of the third generation, Japanese sales have occurred under the RX name as opposed to Harrier as had been the case previously. In the fourth generation, a turbocharged (2.0-liter inline-four) RX 200t/300 model was introduced to replace the previous 2.7-liter unit.

The RX has been assembled at Toyota Motor Kyushu since launch. The RX and RX Hybrid were the first Lexus models to be built outside Japan, with North American market versions produced at the Toyota Motor Manufacturing Canada plant in Cambridge, Ontario beginning 2003 (RX) and expanded in 2014 (RX Hybrid). Hybrid transaxles are built at the Kokura plant in Kitakyushu, Fukuoka since 2009.

First generation (XU10; 1998)

1998–2000 
The idea concept behind the RX—a crossover between a luxury sedan and SUV—started in 1993 when it was hypothesized by TMS (Toyota Motor Sales) and Toyota Motor executives during a luncheon in Nagoya. By 1994, that vehicle was officially proposed by TMS executives at product planning meeting in Toyota City, Japan and put into development. In December 1995, the final design directed under designer Makoto Oshima was approved for production, and prototypes later went into testing in 1996. In Japan, the company was selling the Toyota Caldina which offered AWD capability and a spacious interior.

Prior to the RX public debut, a concept sport utility vehicle, the SLV, previewed the model at the Chicago Auto Show on 9 February 1997. The SLV name stood for Sport Luxury Vehicle. The production-ready concept combined the characteristics of an SUV, wagon, and sedan, and featured high-ground clearance and an elevated seating position. The concept's overall design intent was to be commonly used for suburban driving. At the debut of the concept vehicle, it was reported that the crossover was to be based on the ES 300 sedan, and would go into production with an entry-level price of over US$30,000.

The RX was built on a unibody chassis. Its exterior design was not typical of existing four-door vehicles at its introduction. Among design features, the vehicle featured front triangular quarter-windows, door-mounted side mirrors, a rear liftgate with top-mounted spoiler, and translucent front and rear light covers with round lenses. The exterior color scheme was two-tone, with the bumper and lower body-side cladding a gray color. The first-generation Lexus RX was built in Kyushu, Japan.

Introduced in Japan in December 1997 along with V6 powered versions, the four-cylinder powered Harrier was available in front-wheel drive (SXU10) and all-wheel drive (SXU15) form. Both models were fitted with a 4-speed automatic transmission. The Japanese-market Toyota Harrier could be optioned with JBL sound system, sport seats, and a leather steering wheel. The Harrier found success in the Japanese market, and was also shipped as grey imports to right hand drive markets in Asia and Canada.

The V6-powered model was available in front-wheel drive (MCU10) and all-wheel drive (MCU15) form, which comprised all RX 300 sales in export markets from March 1998 to 2003, and Harrier V6 sales in Japan from 1997 to 2003. The transmission, a 4-speed automatic unit, offered a "Snow" mode which started the vehicle in second gear for better traction in adverse weather conditions. For the RX 300, a 240-watt, 7-speaker Pioneer sound system was standard, while a premium Nakamichi customized sound system was available as an option. Interior features further included Walnut wood trim and an optional in-dash six-CD changer. The overall RX 300 concept, which directed SUV qualities to an on-road vehicle, was based on market research which found that merely 7 percent of SUV owners drove off-road. The RX 300 interior featured leather trim, two rows of seating, and a rear cargo area which could be concealed beneath a tonneau cover. The center dashboard was dominated by a central liquid crystal display (LCD) multi-information screen for audio, climate, and performance data, along with a U-shaped wood trim piece and a pair of air conditioning vents. The gear shift was mounted at the base of the center console, thus leaving open space below for additional storage space, legroom, or movement to the passenger-side seat. The rear seats could be adjusted forward and back, as well as fold flat for increased cargo room.

Safety features included driver and passenger front airbags, front seat-mounted side torso airbags, anti-lock brakes, side impact door beams, daytime running lights, and five headrests as standard. Vehicle Stability Control, an electronic stability program, was optional at the RX 300's debut, and became standard in 2000. The Insurance Institute for Highway Safety (IIHS) rated the RX 300 "Good" overall in their frontal offset crash test.

2000–2003 

In 2000, the RX 300 was refreshed with revised headlights and tail lights, along with the option of high-intensity discharge (HID) headlamps. The interior also gained the option of a DVD-based navigation system. A burgundy exterior color, Venetian Red Pearl, was only offered on 1999–2000 year models.

As before, the engine was offered with either front-wheel drive (ACU10) or all-wheel drive (ACU15) versions. A small facelift was also performed on the Harrier. Options included sport-tuned suspension and DVD voice navigation.

In 2001, a limited edition "Silversport" was offered that included a monochromatic paint scheme in Millennium Silver or Black with an all black interior and perforated leather seats. Exclusively for 2002, Lexus introduced the limited RX 300 "Coach Edition," featuring perforated leather trim in the interior, honeycomb grille, Coach badging on the exterior and interior, and a set of Coach luggage.

Awards won by the first-generation Lexus RX include most appealing luxury SUV by J.D. Power and Associates in 1998, Motor Trend Sport/Utility of the Year for 1999, Money magazine's Best Deal on the Road in the SUV class in 1999, and Kelley Blue Book's Best to Hold Value Award in 1999, 2000, and 2001.

The RX 300 sold over 370,000 units in its five years on the market. It was successful in terms of sales, and became the best-selling Lexus model shortly after its introduction. Its popularity contributed to the growth of the premium crossover SUV market, with several rival makes launching competing models in response to the RX 300.

Second generation (XU30; 2003)

2003–2006 
In 1999, development began on the XU30 platform under chief engineer Yukihiro Okane. Design work was started under Makoto Oshima and would continue into 2000 when a concept design by Hiroshi Sukuki was approved. By early 2001, the final production design was green-lighted by the executive board, with the first prototypes being tested in 2002. Design patents were filed on 1 April 2002 under No. 794 at the Japanese Patent Office and on 21 April 2003 at the United States Patent and Trademark Office.

The XU30 was previewed in January 2003 at the North American International Auto Show. From the inside, the RX 330 interior featured genuine Golden Bird's Eye Maple or Walnut wood trim, a sliding multi-level center storage console, dual-zone climate control, and power tilt/telescopic steering column. Available options included a 210-watt, 11-speaker Mark Levinson premium sound system, DVD-based navigation system with backup camera, rear seat DVD player with wireless headphones, panoramic three panel moonroof, and heated seats.

All RX models came standard with eight airbags, including dual front airbags, front row side torso airbags, side curtain airbags, a driver's knee airbag; Vehicle Stability Control (VDIM on RX 400h) and a tire-pressure monitoring system were standard. An Adaptive Front-lighting System (AFS) with HID headlamps and a backup camera (w/navigation system) were optional. In Japan, the Toyota Harrier was the first worldwide production car with optional radar-assisted Pre-Collision System (PCS) (Forward collision warning only, no autonomous braking). front and side view monitoring and cornering assist monitor with threat monitor. The Lexus RX received a "Good" overall rating in the Insurance Institute for Highway Safety frontal crash test. U.S. National Highway Traffic Safety Administration (NHTSA) crash test results in 2004 rated the RX 330 the maximum five stars in the Frontal Driver, Frontal Passenger, Side Driver, and Side Rear Passenger categories, and four of five stars in the Rollover category.

In February 2003, the second-generation Toyota Harrier (codename ACU30 and MCU30 for the front-wheel drive models, and ACU35 and MCU35 for the all-wheel drive models) was launched in Japan. The Harrier was fitted either a 2.4 L I4 or 3.0 L V6 with or without all-wheel drive, and a new 5-speed automatic transmission with +/- shift along with available "AIRS" air-suspension on the 3.0 L V6 models. The new RX launched for European and Asian markets in early 2003, where it was sold as the RX 300 (MCU30/MCU35) and made in Japan. Asian markets included Singapore, where it succeeded the previously sold Harrier, South Korea, and Taiwan. The RX 300 featured a 3.0 L V6, with only the all-wheel drive version available, and air-suspension could be specified.

In North America, the RX 330 series began sales in March 2003 for the 2004 model year. Here, the car was badged RX 330 denoting its larger 3.3-liter V6. The RX 330 (MCU33/MCU38) was powered by a 3.3-liter ULEV certified 3MZ-FE V6, rated at  SAE and  linked to a 5-speed automatic and was offered in either front or all-wheel drive. New technology features included Adaptive Front-lighting System (AFS) with swivel headlights, height-adjustable air suspension on the all-wheel drive models, Dynamic Laser Cruise Control system, and rain-sensing wipers. All North American models were initially built in Japan until September 2003 when production of the RX 330 began in Cambridge, Ontario, Canada. For each year of the second and third generation RX, a small number of non-hybrid RXs were assembled in Japan.

Lexus debuted the RX 400h (MHU38) at the 2004 North American International Auto Show, with plans to launch the vehicle in the U.S. market. The equivalent Harrier Hybrid debuted in Japan on 22 March 2005, the same day as the Toyota Highlander Hybrid. Hybrid production began in March 2005 at Toyota Motor Kyushu. The Lexus RX 400h made its U.S. sales debut in mid-2005, with over 9,000 pre-orders at launch. The RX 400h's arrival in the U.S. had been delayed by several months; Lexus had announced in November 2004 that the American launch of the hybrid Lexus SUV would occur for the 2006 model year. The RX 400h became the first production premium hybrid vehicle when it went on sale in 2005.

Compared to the Lexus RX 330 and RX 350, the RX 400h featured a different front grille and round fog lights, and also differently styled LED taillights in place of the conventional LED ones on the RX 330/RX 350. Different exterior colors were offered. In 2007, Hybrid badging was added to the rear side doors. The RX 400h interior featured a hybrid information display on the navigation screen showing electrical motor, gasoline engine, and regenerative braking activation in real time. Some RX 400h models without navigation screens displayed the information on a small monochrome display on the instrument panel. When launched in 2005, the RX 400h came exclusively with brushed aluminum interior accents, in place of the wood trim offered in the standard RX. This changed in 2006, when the RX 400h became available with Bird's Eye Maple wood trim.

Since its launch, the all-wheel drive RX 400h/Harrier Hybrid was sold at a substantial premium over the non-hybrid RX 300/RX 330/RX 350/Harrier. A front-wheel drive version of the RX 400h debuted in 2006, with a base MSRP approximately  less than the all-wheel drive RX hybrid. Based on the 2010 Lexus RX redesign, there was no RX 400h for the 2009 model year. However, the RX 400h did receive a facelift for the 2008 model year, featuring a blue Lexus badge and a rear spoiler that matches the body color.

The gasoline-powered part of the RX 400h engine system was a 3.3-liter 3MZ-FE V6, very similar to the one found in the RX 330. With Lexus Hybrid Drive, under normal driving conditions, only the front motor and gasoline engine were used. The rear motor was only used under full-throttle acceleration or when the front wheels lost traction. An Ni-MH battery was responsible for powering the motors, and charged by generators during deceleration or sharp cornering. Standard features included an Electronically Controlled Brake and Vehicle Dynamics Integrated Management stability control system.

Not only did the hybrid drive in the RX 400h improve fuel economy, but with the assistance of the electric motor, the RX 400h could reach  in 7.3 seconds, quicker than the gasoline-only RX. Despite the increased performance, the RX 400h/Harrier Hybrid consumed roughly the same amount of gasoline as a compact four-cylinder sedan and it qualified as a Super Ultra Low Emission Vehicle (SULEV) in the US. Passing power at lower and mid engine rpm's was noticeably improved due to the electric motor. The water pump for the gasoline engine is driven by the camshaft belt. To improve efficiency, and because the gasoline engine shuts down during electric-only operation, the alternator, power steering pump, and air conditioner compressor are beltless; rather than being tied to engine output, these components are powered by electric motors via the battery instead.

The RX 400h served as the launch vehicle of the Lexus hybrid lineup, which later expanded to include hybrid versions of other Lexus vehicles, including the GS 450h and LS 600h/LS 600h L, and in 2009, the first ever designated-hybrid (no gasoline model available) Lexus, the HS 250h.

In January 2005, Lexus introduced the RX 330 "Thundercloud Edition" for the U.S. market, featuring a chrome horizontal-slatted grille, unique 5-spoke 18" alloy wheels, black Bird's Eye Maple wood trim, Thundercloud badges and carpeted floor mats, and two special exterior colors (Thundercloud Metallic and Thundercloud Flint Mica). Production was limited to 6,500 units.

2006–2008 

In 2006 for the 2007 model year, the RX received a mid-cycle refresh consisting of a new 3.5-liter 2GR-FE V6 replacing the 3.3-liter 3MZ-FE V6 engine on non-hybrid models, updating the vehicle's name from RX 330 to RX 350, with new model codes GSU30 and GSU35. The RX 350 also featured an updated, Lexus Generation V DVD navigation system with improved graphics, voice controlled destination inputs, and a new feature called "bread crumbs." Bread crumbs will enable drivers to retrace their steps. The new navigation system also featured voice dial systems and the ability to enter destinations by voice address while driving.

In 2007 for the 2008 model year, the RX received a revised grille, chrome door handles, available new seven-spoke 18-inch alloy wheels with a liquid graphite finish, and Brandy Wine Mica or Desert Sage Metallic were new exterior choices. Black Bird's Eye Maple wood with gray interior was a new interior option for that year.

In February 2008 for the 2009 model year, Lexus added a new Pebble Beach Edition, limited to 6000 units, with a base MSRP of  – . These limited production models have "Pebble Beach" badges on front fenders and embroidered front floor mats, were available in Black Onyx and Truffle Mica color, and came equipped with limited-edition 18-inch alloy wheels, a color-keyed rear spoiler, and a chrome-finished grille. Buyers also received a choice of custom amenities designed to complement the Pebble Beach lifestyle. RX 350, RX 400h, and Harrier 350G's Production ended in December 2008. Harrier 240G and Harrier Hybrid's production ended in July 2013 and replaced by Toyota Harrier (XU60) in November 2013.

The RX 330 was named most appealing luxury SUV by J.D. Power and Associates in 2004. The Lexus RX 400h was one of only four SUVs to achieve recognition on J.D. Power and Associates' 2006 Automotive Environmental Index of the top 30 most environmentally friendly vehicles. J.D. Power also awarded the RX 400h the top spot for entry-luxury SUVs in its 2005 Automotive Performance, Execution and Layout Study on owners' attitudes towards new vehicle designs. At the 2005 GreenFleet Awards in the United Kingdom, recognizing environmentally friendly transportation, Lexus was recognized for introducing the RX 400h with the 4x4 Manufacturer of the Year title. The RX 400h was named SUV of Texas at the 2005 Texas Truck Rodeo awards, and was awarded recognition as a CNET editor's choice vehicle in 2005.

Third generation (AL10; 2008)

2008–2012 
Development of the third-generation RX began in 2004. Chief engineer Takayuki Katsuda headed development, with design being conducted from 2005. In late 2006, design work by Masanari Sakae was chosen, with the final designs that were presented as 1:1 scale models being green-lighted for production in the first half of 2007. On 9 October 2007, design patents were filed at the Japanese Patent Office (7 April 2008 in the U.S.) for both a conceptual variant and two production variants (RX and RX 450h). The first North American pre-production prototypes were sent to Cambridge, Canada in early 2008 for testing prior to the first RX 350 rolling off the production line on 28 November 2008. A hybrid concept vehicle, the LF-Xh, previewed the third-generation RX's design direction at international auto shows a year prior to the production model's debut. The LF-Xh, which stands for Lexus Future-Crossover(X) hybrid, was first shown at the 2007 Tokyo Motor Show. The LF-Xh featured a V6 engine with electric motors, LED headlights and taillights, and a concept interior.

Lexus debuted the third-generation RX on 19 November 2008. The AL10 series is built in Japan and Canada, with North American models primarily built in Cambridge, Ontario, Canada. American RX 350 sales began in February 2009 as a 2010 model. For 2009, the front-wheel drive RX 350 starts at US$36,800 while the all-wheel drive version starts at US$38,200. EPA-estimated fuel economy is improved at city/highway/combined 18/25/21 mpg for the FWD RX 350 and 18/24/20 mpg for the AWD model. The RX 350 (GGL10/GGL15) features a revised 3.5-liter 2GR-FE V6 engine producing  with a wider power curve, it remains ULEV-II certified and now uses a six-speed automatic transmission with sequential shift.

The third-generation RX's new transmission can lock-up its torque converter from 2nd through 6th gears to improve fuel economy. By dropping the center locking differential, a new Active Torque Control all-wheel drive system diverts anywhere from 50% or up to 100% power to the front wheels for reduced drivetrain associated efficiency losses which in turn increases fuel efficiency. An Electric Power Steering (EPS) system replaces the previous belt-driven hydraulic pump. A double wishbone rear suspension setup replaces the previous MacPherson strut design for improved handling and greater cargo space, while an optional Sports Package adds a performance-tuned suspension.

The AL10 RX's new exterior styling adopts the L-finesse design language, and outer features include a rear spoiler which hides the rear window wiper and radio antenna creating a less cluttered appearance. Exterior dimensions are increased, with cargo room increased by five percent over the prior generation. For the interior, major standard features include SmartAccess, a keyless entry and start system, electrochromic heated side mirrors, UV reducing exterior glass, Bluetooth, power tilt/telescoping steering wheel, power 10-way driver and passenger seats, sliding and reclining rear seats and a power rear hatch. The instrument cluster's multi-function display uses an organic light-emitting diode (OLED) display instead of a thin film transistor (TFT-LCD) display. New cabin technologies include VoiceBox Technologies conversational speech voice recognition system, the first of its kind in the U.S., which can recognize general speech commands. The new hard disk drive HDD-based navigation system no longer uses a touchscreen, instead replacing it with Lexus' Remote Touch controller, similar in function to a computer mouse, with haptic feedback. Optional accessory features include XM Satellite Radio, a 15-speaker 330-watt Mark Levinson Surround Sound audio system, a dual-screen Rear Seat Entertainment System (RSES), 19-inch wheels, heated and ventilated front seats, power front seat cushion extender, perforated and semi-aniline leather seats, a smog sensor for the HVAC system, power folding side view mirrors, and navigation system. With XM subscription the navigation adds real-time NavTraffic and NavWeather updates.

The third-generation RX comes standard with a twin-chamber front passenger airbags, side torso airbags for the front row, side curtain airbags for front and rear rows, and knee airbags for the front row. Active headrests become standard to help reduce whiplash injuries. Vehicle Stability Control (VSC) and Hill Assist Control (HAC) which helps prevent the vehicle from rolling backwards on inclines are standard while a more advanced Vehicle Dynamics Integrated Management (VDIM) system is optional. VDIM is designed to be more subtle and less intrusive in performance than VSC alone, VDIM can also engage prior to an actual skid taking place acting as a preventative measure. The Adaptive Front-lighting System (AFS) remains optional, while a new bi-xenon optional Intelligent Highbeam feature is added, this system can dim the high-beams automatically whenever traffic is detected. Other optional safety features include a Pre-Collision System (PCS) and a Head-up Display (HUD) which helps the driver keep attention on the road ahead by displaying navigation, speed, and audio information on the windshield; the HUD uses high-intensity LEDs displaying high contrast white figures on the windshield allowing it to be read in direct sunlight. The optional navigation system offers a backup camera and a Wide-View Side Monitor utilizes a camera on the passenger side view mirror to help eliminate blind spots on the passenger side at low speeds, this system does not include the 180° wide-angle front camera found in the LX 570. To further help improve visibility, water-repellent glass is used on the front doors.

Introduced in 2009 as a 2010 model year vehicle, the RX 450h (GLV10/GLV15) premiered alongside its non-hybrid counterpart, the RX 350. Manufacturer's specifications indicated largely identical outward dimensions for the RX 450h with the RX 350. The RX 450h was scheduled to go on sale in the U.S. in mid to late 2009, with sales introductions for the RX 450h in Asia (including Japan) and Europe in the same year. The new inverter is 8 kg lighter, and more efficient. Up to three electric motors are used in the hybrid system, including two dual motors for the forward wheels (123 kW output), and a third for the rear wheels on the AWD model (50 kW; engages when slippage is detected or the throttle pressed firmly). The RX 450h's V6 engine now runs on the Atkinson cycle for added efficiency. Compared to the prior Otto cycle system, the Atkinson cycle has a lower compression ratio, along with higher expansion ratio inside engine cylinders. This system uses less energy to form fuel-air mixtures, and releases more energy. A lighter, more free-flowing oil (0W-20) is also used, reducing friction energy loss and oil pump power requirements. Two additional systems are added to the RX 450h's Lexus Hybrid Drive powertrain, an exhaust heat recovery system to reduce engine warm-up periods (optimizing engine start-stop times, particularly in cold conditions), and a cooled exhaust gas-recirculation system to reduce fuel pumping loss. The electric motors use the first automotive application of liquid cooling on both sides of the high-current transistors, allowing greater contribution from the electric motors versus the gasoline engine.

Fuel efficiency for the RX 450h, according to EPA testing, is increased by twenty percent over the previous RX 400h. Initial manufacturer data pointed to an increase of at least eight percent over the prior model. In the U.S., the RX 450h is certified with a 2009 EPA fuel economy rating of 32 mpg city, 28 highway for the FWD model, and 30 mpg city, 28 highway for the AWD model. This 30 mpg combined rating compares with the 20 mpg combined rating of the non-hybrid RX model. The powertrain is linked to an instrument panel Eco light indicator, which enables drivers to monitor their fuel efficiency as it correlates with accelerator modulation.

In August 2010, Lexus began offering the RX 270 (AGL10), a front-wheel drive model with a 2.7-liter 1AR-FE inline-four engine, in Japan, China, and Russia. The RX 270 was a new entry-level offering for the RX lineup, produced with a lower base price and fewer emissions. It was introduced at the 2010 Moscow Auto Show, and aimed to circumvent the additional taxes applied to automobiles with large engine displacements and higher emissions; import cars in China over 3.0 L are subject to additional fees.

In July 2010, Bloomberg reported that an all-electric Lexus RX had been developed in partnership with Tesla Motors. The RX was fitted with a Tesla-designed battery pack, and is to be used as a test mule for electric vehicle development.

2012–2015 

A facelift was designed through late 2010 and patented on 7 January 2011 under European design registration number 001845801-0004. The facelift was unveiled at the March 2012 Geneva Motor Show with new wheels, interior colors, new head and tail lamps and new grilles. New LED running lights were introduced as well. The F Sport was introduced, with a honeycomb grille, 8-speed automatic transmission, and a unique sporty interior. In the US, the new model uses the Lexus Enform telematics system, which includes the Safety Connect SOS system and Shazam tagging. Sales began worldwide in April 2012 for the RX 350 and RX 450h, with sales for the F-Sport variants starting in July of the same year.

Several awards won by the third-generation Lexus RX include AutoPacific Vehicle Satisfaction Award for Luxury Crossover SUV, Kelley Blue Book Best Resale Value Award for Luxury Utility Vehicle, and Residual Value Award for Near Luxury SUV from Automotive Lease Guide. The Insurance Institute for Highway Safety (IIHS) has awarded the RX 350 its Top Safety Pick accolade. In 2013, J.D. Power and Associates named the RX as the most dependable vehicle in the U.S.; it was the first time a SUV/crossover had ever been listed as such.

The U.S. National Highway Traffic Safety Administration (NHTSA) crash test results has given the RX 350 the maximum five star rating in the Frontal Driver, Frontal Passenger, Side Driver, and Side Rear Passenger categories, and four of five stars in the Rollover category at a risk of 16.4%. The Insurance Institute for Highway Safety rated the RX 350 a Top Safety Pick given "Good" overall ratings in both frontal offset and side crash tests, the RX also received "Good" ratings in all 14 measured categories. In 2014 (for the 2015 U.S. model year), the North American Lexus RX 350 gains new standard equipment such as the popular display audio package and LED front fog lamps. Navigation equipped models receive an upgraded 19 inch wheel finish as well as an easier to use remote touch controller. The 2015 model year F-Sport models now have the option of a cabernet red interior.

Safety

1 strength-to-weight ratio: 4.27

Fourth generation (AL20; 2015) 

Lexus debuted the fourth-generation RX at the April 2015 New York International Auto Show, including a "floating roof design" and a revised, bolder "Spindle Grille". The RX features a  version of the 3.5 L V6 engine that is mated to an 8-speed automatic transmission. Its hybrid system uses a 1.872 kWh nickel-metal-hydride battery. Lexus also offers a model equipped with a four-cylinder gasoline turbocharged 8AR-FTS engine called the RX 200t (renamed to RX 300 for 2018 model year onwards), but this model is not available in North America. The vehicle is larger than the previous generation, with a  increase in wheelbase, providing more interior room throughout. To counter issues with the previous version's F-Sport ride quality being too firm, in the pursuit of sporty handling, the new generation features an Adaptive Variable Suspension (AVS) to adjust ride quality as needed. An active anti-roll bar from the European specification third generation RX was added to the F-Sport package. Twenty-inch alloy wheels are also available, as is a panoramic sunroof. An  center console display screen is standard equipment, with an optional 12.3” display.

The release of the RX in the United States was scheduled for November 2015. For the first time in the U.S. market, Lexus released an F Sport version of the RX hybrid, the RX 450h F Sport.

The North American RX models are manufactured in Cambridge, Ontario, Canada and have about 25 percent of their parts coming from Japan. The RX is also manufactured in Toyota's plant in Fukuoka, Kyushu, Japan for markets outside North America with 64 percent of its parts coming from Japan.

RX L 
In November 2017, Lexus announced new three-row seven-passenger models of the RX, the RX 350 L and RX 450h L. They are  longer than the two-row model but have the same wheelbase.

Refresh 
The RX and RX L received a facelift in May 2019. The refreshed model is equipped with the newer Lexus Safety System Plus 2.0 suite. For the interior, new touchpad and touchscreen infotainment interfaces were added.

In 2020, for the 2021 model year, both blind-spot monitoring and rear cross-traffic alert became standard, and wireless smartphone charging became available as an option. Smartphone mirroring systems (both Apple CarPlay and Android Auto) were also introduced. Lexus Safety System+ 2.0 was also added to the RX for 2020.

In 2021, for the 2022 model year daytime bicyclist detection and low-light pedestrian detection and with Road Sign Assists and Lane Tracing Assist become available.

Fifth generation (ALA10/ALH10; 2022) 

The fifth-generation RX was unveiled on 31 May 2022. Built on the GA-K platform, it is available in four models: RX 350, RX 350h, RX 450h+, and RX 500h F Sport Performance. The RX 500h model is equipped with Direct4 all-wheel drive system.

Unlike the previous generation, this vehicle comes only a five-passenger seating, no seven-passenger seating with the third row is offered. However, the newer platform, revised dimensions and fitment of suspension components allow for larger interior space.

The front "spindle grille" found in most Lexus model is redesigned into a more three-dimensional mass, evolving into a design element Lexus called as "spindle body". The grille is smaller and less pointed than before. The A-pillars have also been moved back to emphasize the elongated hood.

The front fenders are made of aluminium, while the B-pillars are made of 2 GPa class hot-stamped steel, which is claimed as a world first in terms of both safety and weight reduction. The mounting points for the rear suspension and its member mounting points have been highly reinforced using short pitch welding, laser screw welding and structural adhesives, creating a rigid high-torsion rear body frame. For a more linear steering response, highly rigid die-cast aluminium is used for the steering support. Adaptive Variable Suspension (AVS) is standard on F Sport models.

Powertrain 

The fifth-generation RX is offered with four-cylinder engines from Toyota's Dynamic Force family, with the 3.5-liter V6 option dropped entirely.

For RX 500h F Sport Performance, it is equipped with the Direct4 all-wheel drive system, which features a rear-mounted electric motor (marketed as eAxle), combined with the T24A-FTS engine, a parallel hybrid system and a six-speed automatic transmission.

The range also includes an addition of the RX 450h+ plug-in hybrid, which uses the A25A-FXS engine, an eCVT, an 18.1 kWh lithium-ion battery as well as front and rear electric motors. There are four modes available (EV, Auto EV/HV, HV and Self-charging) and all-wheel drive is provided by the rear electric motor that makes up the E-Four system, allowing for front-rear torque distribution between 100:0 and 20:80.

Sales 
The success of the Lexus RX has been particularly strong in the United States, where it has been the best-selling luxury SUV since its introduction. As one of the earliest luxury crossovers on the market, the RX has inspired similar competitors from rival marques. The Lexus RX is the top selling Lexus hybrid, with global sales of 335,000 units through March 2016, out of one million Lexus hybrids delivered since 2005.

As of April 2015, Lexus had accumulated more than 2.1 million RX models worldwide. The Lexus RX 400h/RX 450h is the top selling Lexus hybrid, with global sales of 335,000 units through March 2016, out of one million Lexus hybrids sold worldwide.

References

External links 

 

RX
Cars introduced in 1998
2000s cars
2010s cars
2020s cars
Compact sport utility vehicles
Mid-size sport utility vehicles
Luxury crossover sport utility vehicles
Front-wheel-drive vehicles
All-wheel-drive vehicles
Hybrid sport utility vehicles
Partial zero-emissions vehicles
Plug-in hybrid vehicles
Euro NCAP large off-road
Vehicles with CVT transmission